Cooking the potato, a tuber that has been consumed for more than 8,000 years, only really developed after the 16th century (i.e. after the discovery of this vegetable in America by the Spanish explorers), and took nearly three centuries to become established in certain regions. In the 20th century, this type of cooking was practiced on all continents, as the potato, a source of carbohydrates, proteins and vitamin C, was easy to grow and became one of the staple foods of mankind; the method of preparation, however, can modify its nutritional value.

Prepared in its skin or peeled (for which specific cooking utensils have been invented), braised, steamed, boiled, grilled, sautéed, fried, the potato is used as a main dish, as a side dish to other foods, or as an ingredient in omelets, stews, etc. It is also used as a thickener, or for its by-products (starch or modified starches).

The potato is also cooked for the realization of gastronomic menus. It can be found at different moments of the meal, from the aperitif to the digestif, through the soup, the starter, the main course and the dessert.

This cuisine is traditionally based on fresh tubers, but the share of preserved and industrially processed products is increasing, until it becomes predominant in the 21st century, especially in Western countries.

Ancient preparations

Peru 

Joseph Dombey, in a letter written from Lima on May 20, 1779, specifies the ancestral way used by the Peruvians to prepare potatoes that constitute, with corn, their only food and that they carry in a haversack during their long journeys: the potato is cooked in water, then peeled and exposed to the wind and the sun until it is completely dry, which allows to preserve it "several centuries, by guaranteeing it of the humidity". This papa seca is mixed with other foods for consumption. Another process consists of freezing the potato and treading on it to remove the skin. Thus prepared, it is put in running water and loaded with stones. Fifteen or twenty days later, it is exposed to the sun until it dries. It becomes the chuño, "a real starch, with which one could make powder for the hair". The Peruvians use it to prepare jams, a flour for convalescents, and mix it with almost all their dishes.An author of the 20th century points out that the process of the Peruvians, who operate by freezing followed by dehydration, is not other than "a freeze-drying by the natural means". He specifies that the tubers are left in frozen water several nights before being exposed to the sun and trodden on and that, "to make the product suitable for consumption, it is enough to put it back in water". According to him, the Spaniards used this preparation in the 16th century to feed the indigenous people forced to work in the silver mines of Potosi.

Chuño is still produced in the Andean Altiplano, specifically in the Suni and Puna regions, which are the only regions with suitable eco-climatic conditions, and is consumed in Argentina, Bolivia, Chile and Peru. According to the botanist Redcliffe Salaman, in prehistoric times, chuño was ground into flour and incorporated into all kinds of stews and chupes, a kind of hearty soup of very ancient origin, but still cooked.

Another traditional product of the Altiplano is tocosh, obtained from the fermentation of potatoes left in a stream of water for at least six months. This product, considered to have probiotic properties, is used in the preparation of a local dessert, the mazamorra de papas.

Diffusion in North-Western Europe and in the heart and margins of the Holy Roman Empire 
The potato was initially a collection and botanical garden plant, but its status changed from that of an object of botanical curiosity and an ornamental plant to that of a true cultivated plant, providing tubers for animal and human consumption in a prolific manner. The disasters of the Thirty Years' War are not foreign to this evolution and to its promotion as a cultivated plant, first in home gardens and then in fields, first out of season and in a stealthy way. The kingdom of France, attached to its cereal production, is an exception.

Principality of Liege 

It seems that the first book to give recipes for potatoes was written by the chef of three successive prince-bishops of the Principality of Liège: the Ouverture de cuisine of Lancelot de Casteau, published in 1604, which gives four ways of cooking this plant, which was still exotic for Europe:

The absence of salt in the seasoning is justified by the fact that the salt present in the butter at the time was sufficient.

Lancelot de Casteau makes no comment on the vegetable, its origin, its price, or the ease or difficulty of finding it on the market. However, he has been using potatoes since at least December 12, 1557, since the dish "boiled potato" appears in the third course of the banquet that he organized on that date for the Joyous Entry of Prince-Bishop Robert of Berghes. As a court cook, he had to use quality products while keeping a reasonable budget, as he worked on his own funds and was only paid after presenting his statement of fees.

The potato was cooked in the Principality of Liege sixty years before being offered "as a rarity at the table of the king" of France Louis XIII, in 1616.

Ireland 

In Ireland, the potato, introduced at the end of the 16th century, quickly became the main staple food until the end of the 19th century.

Among the peasants, it appears at every meal and in one form, the simplest possible, boiled in water. The tubers, with their skins, are cooked in a cauldron, the only utensil necessary for their preparation, in a bottom of water. After cooking, the contents of the cauldron are poured into a shallow wicker basket, called a skeehogue, which allows for easy draining, and the whole family, sitting around the basket in front of the fireplace, serves itself with its hands, without fork or knife.

In more affluent homes, where people eat at the table, another characteristic utensil is used: a trivet in the form of a fairly high ring (dish ring). Often made of silver and richly decorated, its function was to protect the tabletop from the heat.

In 1740, a shortage of potatoes led to a famine in the country – although on a smaller scale than the one that hit Europe – in Ireland in 1845, causing nearly a million deaths and several million refugees and emigrants.

Lorraine, Alsace and the Vosges mountains 
The lumberjacks of the Dagsburg region, whose staple food since the 18th century is the potato, eat in an ordinary and extraordinary way, the pata, a culinary preparation which can even be adapted to festive times. The term, according to Charles-Joseph Pariset, comes from pasta, which means dough, or better, pate for its speakers of Lorraine German, platt or Lorraine Franconian. This preparation is called Stampfer in High German of the Black Forest. The potatoes are first peeled, then sliced fairly thinly and boiled in ceramic or stoneware pots. After the adequate cooking, the salt is added and then the preparer drains the water, and crushes the material. The paste or pata obtained can be mixed with fresh water (in the woodcutter's hut), milk from the farm, butter (35 to 125 g of butter maximum for about 3 liters of paste), butter and milk, or other ingredients based on various meats or chopped vegetables (festive pata not very accessible to the poor). The final preparation is stirred, crushed, ground, and possibly salted, possibly with fried onions, spiced again and put back into the original pot. In the 19th century, with the imposition of French culinary standards, for example by the école ménagère, the preparation and/or the term disappeared to make way for the purée and the various gratins dauphinois.

Slow appropriation in France 

Arrived in Europe in the 16th century, this solanaceous plant (with a pink skinned tuber in England and a yellow skin in Spain) spread in the Principality of Liege, Ireland, Flanders, Germany, Switzerland, Italy, Austria, etc.

In France, its resemblance with toxic species (for example the daturas, known for their toxicity to livestock, but also to humans) and the lack of techniques of conservation and use, are brakes to its cultivation, beside purely agronomic reasons (bad ecological adaptation) or religious (non-perception of the tithe on this food). In the Théâtre d'agriculture et Mesnage des champs, published in 1600, Olivier de Serres already recommended the cultivation of the "white truffle" or "cartoufle" and found it to have a flavor worthy of the best black truffles. Around 1750, the cultivation and consumption of tubers were recommended by several people or institutions: Duhamel du Monceau, the bishops of Albi and Léon, the minister Turgot, Rose Bertin, the Agricultural Society of Rennes. Ten years before the publications of Antoine Parmentier and Samuel Engel, Duhamel du Monceau "strongly exhorts farmers not to neglect the cultivation of this plant" and remarks that "it is an excellent food especially with a little bacon and salted pork".

But the French population remains more than reticent before this dish: the majority of French people still disdain it as a food for humans, even if it is cultivated and used in some regions. However, this vegetable is an alternative to wheat, the food base whose lack has caused shortages for centuries, which will lead to the Great Fear or an increase in the price of bread, such as it will be one of the popular reasons for the support of the people to the bourgeoisie during the French Revolution, the hungry crowd going to Versailles to get the "Boulanger" (Louis XVI), the "Boulangère" (Marie-Antoinette) and the "Petit Mitron" (the dauphin).

According to contemporaries:To these words, La Feuille villageoise adds: "The example of honest, good farmers and landlords will suffice to familiarize the most stubborn day laborer with this new food; we could also use the ingenious means that were used in Ireland to accustom the least educated and least well-to-do portion of the people. In the schools, when a child had learned his lesson well, he was given a potato as a reward. When he had earned the prize for wisdom as well as for memory, he was given several; he ate them with delight; his classmates envied him, or feasted on the portion he was willing to give them. Sometimes he brought his apple home; the parents tasted it and found it good. Insensibly, the general repugnance of the people fell away, and it was not two generations before the potato became the favorite stew of the Irish."

Invention of products 
In the 18th century, the potato was actively studied in all its practical aspects: cultivation and reproduction, diseases, use as a food for animals and as a vegetable for humans. Its use was also considered in the same way as that of cereals which produce flour – and therefore bread – but also alcohol. Other uses and by-products were born, some of which still exist in the 21st century.

Starch 

As early as 1731, starch was extracted from the potato and used as a substitute for wheat starch.

It is also used in pastries and cookies; it is in particular an ingredient of the Gâteau de Savoie; it is added, mixed with water, to omelets and is used for sauces in smaller quantities than flour.

Potato starch was used to produce artificial honey that looked like honey from Narbonne. It is still abundantly produced in the 21st century. The extraction of this starch gives rise to an important industrial activity: the "starch factory".

Bread 

In 1771, Samuel Engel mentions, in his Traité de la nature, de la culture, et de l’utilité des pommes de terre par un ami des hommes, that half of Europeans live on bread and the other half on potatoes, and also that bread is made by mixing a third or a quarter of potato with cereal flour, which gives a dish "preferred by taste, to bread of pure wheat".

He refers to various authors, including François Mustel who wrote Mémoire sur les pommes de terre et sur le pain économique. Mustel invented, before 1766, a kind of inverted jointer plane to grate potatoes, peeled or not, into a fine mush that must be mixed with wheat flour: the proportion of one 1/3 flour to 2/3 potatoes gives an edible bread he says, 50% of each ingredient a good one, and at the rate of 2/3 to 1/3, it is difficult to notice that the bread is not pure wheat; the mixture must be kneaded with ordinary sourdough, but less water is used and less heat is applied, which produces an additional saving; this bread keeps fresher for longer, it remains edible for fifteen days, instead of six for traditional bread. This prolongation of freshness, which is very appreciable, encourages many Ardennes farmers to add to their bread, until the 1980s, some 10% of potatoes, the Gaumais going up to 50%.

Research on the use of the tuber for bread making was numerous in France at the end of the 18th century, but this did not lead to the massive perpetuation of this practice. A newspaper of 1847 makes an argument on this subject: "In Scotland, in England, in Holland, in Germany, in Prussia, on the coast of the Baltic, the greater part of the population lives on potatoes during six to seven months of the year. Nowhere is bread made from them. France, which was the last to accept the potato as a food substance, is also the first to use it for a purpose that cannot be profitable. What is the use of going to so much trouble to spoil what is good?"

Potato bread remains in family or regional use: thus we note the Correzian farcidure, Norwegian lefse and Rēwena bread.

Alcohol 

Antoine Parmentier tried to make alcohol and beer from the potato, having learned that in other countries it was being distilled, but he admitted his failure in 1773. Two years before, the Encyclopédie Méthodique reported that potato eau de vie was well known to the Swedes and other Europeans.

Five methods are listed in 1839, in the Dictionnaire technologique:

 By three maneuvers: cooking potatoes, reduction to mush, maceration by malted barley;
 By conversion of the starch into syrup by sulfuric acid;
 By saccharification of cooked potato slurry with sulfuric acid;
 By saccharification of potato pulp with caustic potash;
 By saccharification of potato flour with sulfuric acid.

In 1913, Antonin Rolet gave two recipes for potato starch beer, one made from hops and starch, the other from hops, starch and malt flour, for use by families and agricultural cooperatives.

In the 21st century, aquavit, vodka, poteen and härdöpfeler are still produced from potatoes. These spirits can be used in cooking for deglazing or flambéing.

Cheese 
Louis de Jaucourt, in the Encyclopédie ou Dictionnaire raisonné des sciences, des arts et des métiers, cites a German who invented a way to make three cheeses, from large potatoes boiled in their skins, then peeled and ground with a spoon before being mixed with curdled milk; the cheeses obtained acquire more quality and finesse as they age.

The Encyclopédie Méthodique, which includes this information, specifies the proportions according to which the cheese is intended for the poor (five pounds of vegetables for one pound of curd), for everyone (four pounds for two pounds of curd), or for the best tables (two pounds for four pounds of milk); by adding cream, large cheeses like those of Holland are made. She says that sheep's or goat's milk gives better results than cow's milk.

Coffee 
According to the Encyclopédie ou Dictionnaire raisonné des sciences, des arts et des métiers, the Germans use potatoes as coffee, either by using the whole tuber, boiled, scraped, cut into small cubes and put to dry, or by using the peels, chopped and dried; in both cases, the dried material is roasted, ground, prepared and served like ordinary coffee, with cream for those who prefer it.

Potato syrup 
This potato syrup replaces sugar and sugar syrup. It is used in baking. In the Netherlands, the production of potato syrup started in 1819 in Gouda where the first starch and sugar factory was built.

An 18th century menu 

After having tried for a long time to make bread with potatoes, Antoine Parmentier understood that this tuber should be considered as a versatile vegetable, and that its use required the popularization of recipes that would make it a main food.

In his Examen chymique des pommes de terre published in 1773, he cites (but without giving the precise date) the composition of a menu that he had served to friends:
By applying Menon's idea of creating a meal based on a single food, as this culinary writer had indicated in 1755, in Les Soupers de la cour ou l’art de travailler toutes sortes d’aliments pour servir les meilleures tables, suivant les quatre saisons with his Menu d’un repas servi tout en mouton, Menu d’un repas servi tout en cochon and Menu d’un repas servi tout en œufs, Parmentier demonstrates to a group of influential people in good society, including Nicolas François de Neufchâteau, that the potato can be used, in different forms, at different times of the meal. He thus succeeded in promoting the vegetable on the culinary level, which still leaves its mark on people's minds for a long time to come: "The guests, who were all distinguished men, people in credit or people of spirit, went to the fashionable salons to tell the news of their dinner where the potato reigned without rival", wrote the Semaine des familles, nearly a century later.

Parmentier took every opportunity to promote the tuber: when he received Arthur Young on October 24, 1787, the menu was based on potatoes and, for the first time, his sister Marie-Suzanne Houzeau served, among other dishes, steamed potatoes.

However, the use of this tuber did not become widespread in France until the end of the 19th century, when Alexandre Dumas felt the need to affirm its healthiness:

Nutritional aspects

Influence of preparation methods 
Depending on the preparation and cooking methods, the nutritional value of potatoes can vary greatly. In particular, its energy content, moderate in comparison with other starchy foods, can increase considerably when cooked with fat, and its vitamin content is affected to a greater or lesser extent depending on the cooking method. However, cooking is essential to make it an appetizing and especially digestible food.

In the raw potato, the starch is mainly in the form of resistant starch, so called because it resists digestive enzymes such as amylase. Under the effect of heat, around 50 °C, the amylose swells and causes the starch grains to burst, which "gelatinize" and lose their "resistant" character. However, when the preparation is subsequently cooled, e.g. in salads, the proportion of resistant starch increases due to a retrogradation of the amylose. In boiled potatoes, this proportion can be about 2% (of the total starch) and in potato salad it can be as high as 6%. The resistant starch remains intact in the large intestine, playing a role similar to that of dietary fiber, which may be of interest in some diets.

A 100 g portion of potatoes simply boiled in their skins provides 76 kcal, which is comparable to corn porridge, also 76 kcal, or plantain (94), but is significantly lower than the same portion of dried beans (115), pasta (132), rice (135) or bread (278). They are often paired or cooked with dietary fats, which can significantly increase the potato dishes caloric value.

Cooking in water causes the loss of some of the water-soluble elements, in particular vitamin C, especially when the tubers are peeled. Thus, in the case of a cooking of 25 to 30 minutes in boiling water, peeled potatoes can lose up to 40% of their vitamin C, 10% if they are cooked with the skin (in this last case, there remains 13 mg of vitamin C for 100 g of vegetable). These losses are added to those induced by the storage time, about 50% after three months. Other preparation methods are even more aggressive for vitamin C, but also for B vitamins; for example, pureeing causes up to 80% loss in vitamin C, and frying 60%.

Nevertheless, a 100 g serving of processed potato products can provide 10–50% of the recommended daily allowance of vitamin C for an adult.

Cooking with fat, especially frying, can lead to the formation of acrylamide, a substance that is probably carcinogenic to humans, especially if cooked for too long at high temperatures. This reaction occurs when potatoes contain too many reducing sugars (glucose and fructose); their rate, which should not exceed 0.4 to 0.6% of the fresh weight, depends on the variety, the maturity of the tubers and the storage conditions, low temperatures, below 8 °C, favoring the retrogradation of the starch into reducing sugars.

The potatoes known as "for consumption", i.e. which were harvested with complete maturity, can be preserved several weeks, provided that they are stored in a room that is ventilated, fresh (between 8 and 9 °C) but sheltered from the frost, and obscure because the light makes them green. Early potatoes, harvested before maturity, cannot be stored. They can be kept for a few days at most in the refrigerator crisper drawer.

Associated ingredients 
Among the ingredients often associated with the potato, for example in various regional specialties, are milk and dairy products. These fortunately compensate for the deficiency of the tuber in vitamins A and D, and complete the dish in proteins, lipids and calcium. This explains why entire populations in Ireland and northern Europe have been able to subsist on a diet based almost exclusively on potatoes and milk.

Processed products 
More and more, potatoes are consumed and cooked through industrially processed products, mainly frozen products, most often precooked, or dehydrated (e.g., potato flakes, granules, flour).

The share of processed products exceeds that of table potatoes in some Western countries (United States, Canada, Northern Europe). In Germany, for example, in 2003–2004, processed potatoes accounted for 34.3 kg per capita per year, compared to 32.5 kg for table potatoes. In the United States, the use of fresh potatoes represented, in 2007, only one third of the total consumption.

Most of the time, these are "ready to cook" products, which have the advantage of facilitating the preparation of meals, eliminating the need for tedious peeling, and which can be stored more easily and longer than fresh tubers. The most commonly used are dehydrated flaked mashed potatoes, or instant mashed potatoes, and pre-cooked frozen French fries. The latter are more commonly consumed in the catering industry. The simplest are peeled and pre-cooked vacuum-packed potatoes, which belong to the category of fresh products, known as fifth range. Canned potatoes (tins or jars) are also available on the market, sometimes mixed with carrots or peas.

Potato chips are a special case, since this product is consumed directly, without any culinary preparation, and most often outside the meal.

Before cooking

Choice of varieties 

Depending on the dish to be prepared, the type of cooking and the market, the cook chooses one or another potato among the thousands of varieties that exist. He first relies on the quality of the flesh, the firm-fleshed potatoes being more suitable for this preparation, the floury ones for another.

For preparations where the vegetable must be reduced to a mush, as in mashed potatoes, or dissolved, as in soups, the choice is for floury varieties: 'Arnica', 'Binova', 'Catarina', 'Claudia', 'Daroli', 'Early rose', 'Eba', 'Eersteling', 'Estima', 'Hansa', 'Keltia', 'Ker pondy', 'Prima', 'Trophée', etc.

For preparations where the vegetable, whole or sliced, must hold its shape, we use firm-fleshed varieties: 'Aura', 'Belle de Fontenay', 'BF 15', 'Charlotte', 'Exquisa', 'Franceline', 'Linzer delikatess', 'Ratte', 'Rosa', 'Roseval', 'Rosine', 'Sieglinde', 'Stella', 'Valdor', 'Viola', etc.

These classic recommendations do not prevent chefs from sometimes breaking away from them. For example, Joël Robuchon also prepares his famous mashed potatoes with the Ratte variety.

Some varieties, such as 'Bintje', 'Nicola' or 'Yukon Gold', lend themselves to various preparation methods; the 'Bintje', which is used as a standard by tasters, does not disintegrate when it weighs less than 150 grams. It is one of the most used varieties for frying, especially in Belgium. However, the manufacturers of frozen pre-cooked French fries use more recent varieties, in particular for their agronomic qualities (better resistance to diseases). For example, Aviko, the leading Dutch producer of frozen French fries, mainly uses the 'Agria' variety. In North America, it is the 'Russet Burbank' variety, imposed for a long time by the McDonald's group to its suppliers, which is classically used for French fries, accompanied since 1983 by the 'Shepody', a more recent variety, created in Canada especially for French fries. The choice of the connoisseur also depends on the season, as some species are early and others late.

Peeling

The potato chore. 

The peeling of the potato is traditional for the preparation of a great number of recipes. For some (especially soldiers in the regiment), it represents drudgery, for others the satisfaction of successfully peeling by a spiral movement of the knife around the tuber. Modern varieties, which produce very smooth tubers, with very shallow eyes, have fortunately made this task easier because fine peeling is difficult and, even with a good hand, the knife generally carries away a chip of flesh with the skin. Special tools have been developed to solve this problem and the use of stainless steel blades avoids blackening the hands.

The peeling allows to remove the still green parts of the tuber, to eliminate the solanine, present in the skin, and which can cause intoxications, and to remove, by digging sometimes deeply in the flesh, the "eyes" which are with the birth of the germs. It must be done just before cooking, because the peeled potato left in the air oxidizes; plunged in water, it loses its minerals and vitamins, and is covered with a kind of microbial fluff.

In communities and large families, mechanical electric peelers have been used. In the 21st century, it is common to buy potatoes already peeled and packaged in cans or vacuum-packed.

Industrial peeling 
Efficient techniques have been developed by the industry to peel large quantities of tubers while limiting losses and waste that must then be recycled, usually in animal feed. These techniques are abrasive peeling (the one that produces the most losses), soda peeling (chemical peeling by soaking in a bath of sodium hydroxide at high temperature, followed by rinsing), or steam peeling (a high-pressure steam bath removes the skin from the tubers, which is then vacuumed). The latter method minimizes vitamin losses.

Peelings 
Generally treated as waste, potato peels can also be cooked, in times of shortage or in the context of cooking leftovers. In addition to the cases where the tubers are cooked and served with their skins, for example new potatoes, one can also make appetizers in the form of potato peel chips, or fritters, by dipping peels taken from boiled potatoes in a fritter batter. Baked potatoes cut in half and scooped out with a spoon can be used to make nests, which can be stuffed with other ingredients, such as a poached egg in the case of Oeufs Toupinel.

Size 
The potato can be cooked whole, or cut into pieces, into rolls, thin slices (for chips), parallelepipeds, spheres; turning or fluting it improves its presentation. Depending on the choice, appropriate equipment should be used: a kitchen knife may be sufficient, but a mandoline, a corer, and a melon ball make the work easier.

The equipment used to shape the fries has evolved considerably since the 19th century. At first, it was done with a simple knife with a wooden handle and a steel blade that oxidized quickly. The use of stainless steel and plastic facilitated the maintenance of the object; the mechanical or electric fry cutter then reduced the time of the size and allowed the calibration of the dish.

Cooking methods 
In the potato plant, which belongs to the genus Solanum, only the tuber is edible, as the leaves are toxic, unlike the sweet potato, of the genus Ipomoea, which is eaten with both tuber and leaves.

The potato tuber can be eaten raw, but it is usually eaten cooked. Raw, it is pungent. Used in the navy for its antiscorbutic properties, it seems to have been little appreciated by the consumers; as testified by the commander Kane, in 1863:

The cooking is done dry, in water or steam, and in fat. Potatoes are also used as an ingredient in various preparations.

Dry cooking 

In 1750, Étienne-François Geoffroy gives various information on the cooking of the potato: "The Indians, according to Acosta's report, use its root as bread, they cook it, and season it in different ways; and when they want to preserve it for a long time, they dry it in the sun, and then cut it into slices. It is used in this country [in France] in the manner of truffles; this root is cooked under ashes; the skin is then removed, and it is seasoned with pepper to make it more pungent and pleasant: this food is quite good, and approaches that of parsnips and chestnuts; however, it is very windy, and is not suitable for bad stomachs."

In 1770, Pierre-Joseph Buc'hoz wrote that "the poor eat them out of necessity and the rich out of taste; they are prepared in different ways; the inhabitants of the countryside often only eat them cooked in water or in hot ashes."

Dry cooking can be considered as the first type of cooking, since after the hard day of harvesting or gleaning, the tuber was directly consumed in the field, cooked in a dress, unpeeled, in the ashes of its own tops. Among the Walloons of Ardenne, Famenne and Gaume, it was customary for the farmer to thank his helpers at the end of the harvest with the cûh'née, a meal of dry-cooked potatoes; it was perpetuated in certain regions of Wallonia, by the organization of banquets where the principal dish is the pètêye crompîre ("exploded" potato, whose skin produced a dry noise under the action of heat), seasoned with salt and pepper, accompanied by butter, sliced onions and pickled herrings, beer or pèkèt.

Nestled directly in the hot ashes, surrounded and covered with embers (not placed directly in them), for about 45 minutes, the potato sees its skin roast and crisp, and its flesh reveal all its fragrance; the degree of cooking is checked by pricking in the pulp with a fine and pointed object, like a knitting needle.

Sometimes it was placed in a three-legged cauldron, filled with ash, and placed in the embers, as Colette tells us. In Gaume, the roustiquette was prepared in a cast iron pot, put on fire without any fat, burning the tubers of the bottom which perfumed the others.

In the villages of Wallonia, the potatoes were cooked on the nozzle of the furnace which was used as grill and, in province of Liege, the politeness wanted that one offers some to each visitor by the formula Prindez 'ne crompîre so l' rusté.

Potatoes wrapped in plastic for cooking in the microwave.

It is also possible to use a clay pot that is turned over and over again over the fire, or simply to cook them in a drawer that isolates them from the ashes, or in the oven, or in a hole dug in the ground and covered with stones brought to red by a wood fire, as in the Chilean curanto.

The aluminium foil, which wraps the tuber, often replaces these ancestral practices from the 20th century onwards, and some restaurateurs pre-cook the vegetable in the microwave, before completing the cooking in the hearth or on a hot coal stove. At home, the tuber can be cooked dry, pitted with a few holes, in the microwave oven in 4 to 6 minutes (in the case of a 750 W power), but does not have the typical aroma of cooking in the ashes.

The slowness of traditional cooking allows the use of a firm variety such as a mealy one; the apple should be quite large and rather elongated.

Cooked dry, the potato can be served in a dish lined with a napkin folded over it, with salt, pepper, fresh or salted butter, or with fresh cream, seasoned with spices and chives.

Cut in two, hollowed out of its pulp which is worked with other ingredients before putting the mixture back into the skin, it is a "filled potato", which is often au gratin. The choice of ingredients determines the designation: "old-fashioned" (butter, egg yolks and Gruyere), "Ardennes-style" (diced ham, minced mushrooms browned in butter, egg yolks and herbs), "Brussels-style" (mustard, salt, pepper and nutmeg, the mixture topped with slices of black pudding), "Canadian-style" (browned bacon crumbs, minced onion, salt, pepper, celery seeds, minced green pepper, sugar and vinegar), "à la fermière" (minced leftover stew and cheese), "à la hongroise" (minced onions browned in butter, paprika, a sprinkling of breadcrumbs), "à la parisienne" (minced shallots melted in vinegar, butter, salt, pepper and tomato sauce on the side). The kumpir is a filled potato, usual in Turkish fast food.

The pulp alone, worked with butter, salt and pepper, shaped into small patties that are pan-fried in butter or goose fat, gives Macaire potatoes; bound with butter, béchamel and grated cheese, salt and pepper, until it forms a paste that is pan-fried in a mixture of oil and butter, it gives potato subrics (a kind of croquettes).

Bibliography 

 Cécile Allegri, Claire Brosse, Federico Oldenburg and Hervé Robert, La Pomme de terre, saveurs méditerranéennes, Éditions du Bottin Gourmand, coll. « Les essentiels du goût », 2003, 99 p..
 Joseph Bonjean, Monographie de la pomme de terre envisagée dans ses rapports agricoles, scientifiques et industriels et comprenant l’histoire générale de la maladie des pommes de terre en 1845, Paris, Germer Baillière, 1846, 306 p.
 Collective, La Pomme de terre. Histoire et recettes gourmandes, Grenoble, Glénat, 2009, 160 p..
 Collective, La Pomme de terre, un tour du Monde en 200 recettes, Geneva, United Nations, 2008, 360 p..
 Lucienne Desnoues, Toute la pomme de terre, Paris, Mercure de France, 1978, 302 p.
 Qu Dongyu et Xie Kaiyun, How the Chinese Eat Potatoes, Singapour, World Scientific Publishing Company, 2009, 432 p..
 Jean Ferniot (pref. Joël Robuchon), Chère pomme de terre, First, 1996, 301 p..
 Martine Jolly, Merci M. Parmentier, ou La gloire de la pomme de terre en 200 recettes, Robert Laffont, 1985, 224 p..
 Mme Mérigot, La Cuisinière républicaine, qui enseigne la manière simple d’accommoder les pommes de terre ; avec quelques avis sur les soins nécessaires pour les conserver, Paris, Chez Mérigot jeune, 1794–1795, 42 p.
 C. Monteros, J. Jiménez, Gavilanes, La Magia de la Papa Nativa. Recetario Gastronómico, Quito, INIAP, 2006, 71 p.
 Patrick Pierre Sabatier, La pomme de terre, c’est aussi un produit diététique, Robert Laffont, 1993, 275 p..
 Racines, tubercules, plantains et bananes dans la nutrition humaine, FAP, coll. « Nutrition », no 24, Rome, 1991.
 Joël Robuchon et Patrick Sabatier, Le Meilleur et le Plus Simple de la pomme de terre, Robert Laffont, 1994, 250 p..

Notes

References 

Cooking